The sage Sankriti is the founding rishi of the Sankriti Gotra, one of the 10 lineages in Vedic society. The lineage of Sankriti's is given as Shaktya, Sankritya, and Gaurivita. i.e. lineage of Shakti, Sankriti, and Gauriviti.

Sankriti is the grandson of Sage Vashishta, and the son of Śakti Maharṣi. Incidentally, Śakti Maharṣi is the father of Sage Parashara (the father of Sage Vyasa).

Not much is known about Sage Sankriti except that his name is recorded in the Avadhuta Upanishad, where Lord Dattatreya explains the nature of an avadhuta to Sage Sankriti.

Gotra, Sankritya or Sankrita may be from Sankriti.

References 

Rishis